Harlow College is a further education college in Harlow, Essex, England. This medium-sized college has 5,900 students as of 2018 of which 2,585 are on 16-19 programmes and 2,000 are on adult educational programmes. Its main campus is in the town, while recently an additional site has been built and opened at Stansted Airport, the first of its kind at a major UK airport. Harlow College's Principal and Chief Executive is Karen Spencer.

The current college was established in 1984 as a tertiary college following reorganisation of post-16 education in the town. It replaced the former Harlow Technical College.

The college is distinguished by its success rates and its Journalism Centre, which it has operated since 1964.

Journalism centre
Formed in 1964, Harlow College's Journalism Centre is a journalism training centre, with courses accredited through the National Council for the Training of Journalists (NCTJ) and the Periodical Training Council (PTC). The centre boasts strong links with Anglia Ruskin University in Cambridge, through a BA Hons journalism degree.

The journalism students studying at BTEC level are now able to use the new £9m University Centre Harlow facilities, which is part of Anglia Ruskin University.

The current college was predated by a boys' boarding school of the same name, originally dating from 1862, which was situated in Old Harlow.

The college today
The college has three divisions:
 Corporate services
 Student-focused provision: the Sixth Form, the Vocational Studies Academy.
 Employer-focused provision: the Business & Technology Academy, The Creative Arts Academy, The Employer Response Unit.
In 2006/06, the college enrolled about 2,070 learners aged 16–18 and about 3,040 adult learners, with an income of around £20m.

Notable alumni
 John Earls - music journalist and broadcaster.
 Mark Knopfler - musician, songwriter, composer, producer.
 Steve Lamacq - DJ.
 Felicity Landon - journalist.
 Piers Morgan - television presenter and journalist.
 Sarah Ockwell-Smith - childcare author.
 Norman Watt-Roy - bassist.
 Jaime Winstone - actress.
 Jeremy Clarkson - television presenter and journalist.
 Alan Rusbridger - former editor of The Guardian
 Richard Madeley -  television presenter and journalist.
 Charlie Thomas - Sky News sports presenter.
 John Linger, Brandon Jacobs and Tom Hawkins - founding members of post-punk band Neils Children.
 Charles Shaar Murray - journalist.
 Steve Harley - rock musician, former journalist.
Kelvin Mackenzie - former editor of The Sun.
Sophy Ridge - Sky News presenter.
John Stapleton - Former GMTV, Watchdog, Panorama and Newsnight presenter.
Charlie Hedges - BBC Radio 1 DJ.
Phil Hall - Former editor-in-chief of Hello!

The Harlow Harrier
In September 2010, five students created the college's first student paper - The Harlow Harrier. It gives news on student issues, jobs in journalism, sports news, and local politics. The Founding Editor is Talal Musa - a former News of the World trainee sub-editor who worked on the sports desk at the Daily Mail. Musa now works in esports for Gfinity.

The original 'Harlow College' 1862-1965
The college was opened by the Reverend Charles Miller on 29 May 1862, in Old Harlow. In the early 20th century it was a well-known school with Ernest Percival Horsey as its head. When the Old Harlow area was redeveloped the school was forced to close in 1965.

Headmasters of Harlow College
 29 May 1862: Opened by Charles Miller
 1889 - 1903: Lyndhurst Burton Towne
 1904 - 1935: Ernest Percival Horsey
 1935 - 1936: ? Miller
 1936 - 1962: Kenneth L. Dames
 1962 - 1965: Roy C. Purgavie

Notable alumni
 Gordon de Lisle Lee - Clarenceux King of Arms, 1862–1927.
 Herbert Marshall - actor, 1890–1966.
 George Fellowes Prynne - church designer, 1853–1927.

References

External links
 

Further education colleges in Essex
Educational institutions established in 1964
Educational institutions established in 1984
1964 establishments in England
1984 establishments in England